KLDZ (103.5 FM, "Kool 103.5") is a radio station licensed to serve Medford, Oregon, United States. The station is owned by Bicoastal Media. It airs a classic hits music format.

KOOL 103.5 personalities include market vets Don Hurley and Casey Baker.  Amanda Valentine and Cricket Kincaid round out the weekday talent.  KOOL is also home for American Top 40 rebroadcasts from the 1970s and 1980s, The Ultimate Party and Lovin' Life Living The 80s with Tom Kent, and Beatles Weekly with JC Haze.

The 103.5 frequency was originally licensed to Medford as KOPE. Founded by Roy Masters, it was one of the first FM talk stations in the U.S. and locally featured legendary paranormal author/talker, Art Bell.  After being sold to Citicasters Co. (soon to merge with Clear Channel), the station was assigned the KLDZ call letters by the Federal Communications Commission on February 1, 1999.

Translators

References

External links
KLDZ official website

LDZ
Medford, Oregon
Classic hits radio stations in the United States
Radio stations established in 1991
1991 establishments in Oregon